Saliha Banu Begum ( 10 June 1620) was the chief consort of Emperor Jahangir. She was the Padshah Begum for the most part of the reign of her emperor husband until her death in the year 1620.

Family
Saliha Banu Begum was the daughter of Qaim Khan, and came from a well placed family in the government as her brother, Abdur Rahim (titled Tarbiyat Khan), was said by Jahangir to be "of the hereditary houseborn ones of this Court." She was the granddaughter of Muqim Khan, the son of Shuja'at Khan from Akbar's time.

Marriage
Jahangir married her in 1608, in the third year of his reign. As a consequence, her brother Abdur Rahim's position greatly advanced. He was awarded with the title of Tarbiyat Khan. His son named Miyan Joh, whom Saliha had taken for her son, was killed at the banks of river Jhelum by Mahabat Khan when the latter behaved insolently towards Jahangir, in 1626.

For much of Jahangir's reign, she was the Padishah Banu ("The Sovereign Lady"), also called Padishah Mahal ("Sovereign of the Palace"), and when she died in 1620, the title was passed on to Nur Jahan. She was, reportedly, Nur Jahan's only powerful rival for Jahangir's affections. Williams Hawkins, a representative of the English East India Company noted her among Jahangir's chief wives. He said the following:

Saliha Banu Begum was reportedly to be well versed in Hindi poetry.

Death
Saliha Banu Begum died on Wednesday, 10 June 1620. Jahangir noted that Saliha Banu's death was foretold by the astrologer Jotik Rai; grief-stricken at her loss, he nevertheless marvelled at the accuracy of the prophecy, which had been taken from his own horoscope.

See also
Padshah Begum

References

Bibliography
 

Wives of Jahangir
1620 deaths
16th-century Indian women
16th-century Indian people
17th-century Indian women
Place of birth unknown
Year of birth unknown
17th-century Indian Muslims
Indian nobility